Nia Christopher (born 2 May 2001) is a Bermudian footballer who plays as a forward and a midfielder for American college team Towson Tigers and the Bermuda women's national team.

Early life and education
Christopher was raised in the Devonshire Parish. She attended The John Carroll School in the United States.

College career
Christopher attended Towson University in the United States.

International career
Christopher represented Bermuda at the 2018 CONCACAF Women's U-17 Championship and the 2020 CONCACAF Women's U-20 Championship. She capped at senior level during two CONCACAF W Championship qualifications (2018 and 2022).

See also
List of Bermuda women's international footballers

References

External links

2001 births
Living people
People from Devonshire Parish
Bermudian women's footballers
Women's association football midfielders
Women's association football forwards
Towson Tigers women's soccer players
Bermuda women's international footballers
Bermudian expatriate footballers
Bermudian expatriate sportspeople in the United States
Expatriate women's soccer players in the United States